Other Lives  is the self-titled debut album by American indie rock band Other Lives which was released physically April 7, 2009 by TBD Records and PIAS Recordings and digitally released March 17, 2009.

The lead single "Black Tables" was featured on the 16th episode of season three, "Things Fall Apart" of the television show Ugly Betty, the first episode of season five, "In the Light" of the television show "Covert Affairs", Dream a Little Dream of Me, Part 1 of the television show Grey's Anatomy, and the episode "Every Picture Tells A Story" of the television show One Tree Hill.  The song was also featured in the soundtrack of the 2011 comedy-drama film Let Go.

Reception

Critical
Critical response to Other Lives was generally positive.  everyview.com, which gave the album an 8 out of 10, said the album "plays like Parachutes era Coldplay" and "Other Lives produces a tiny gem of a record that couples classical music with indie rock."

References

2009 debut albums
Other Lives (band) albums
PIAS Recordings albums
TBD Records albums